Yetebulak (Yetebolaq) is a rural locality (a village) in Kugarchinsky Selsoviet, Kugarchinsky District, Bashkortostan, Russia. The population was 131 as of 2010. There is 1 street.

Geography 
Yetebulak is located 49 km south of Mrakovo (the district's administrative centre) by road. Semirechye is the nearest rural locality.

References 

Rural localities in Kugarchinsky District